S. metallica may refer to:

 Sabera metallica, a butterfly species found in Papua, Indonesia, on New Guinea
 Somatochlora metallica, the brilliant emerald, a dragonfly species

See also
 Metallica (disambiguation)